Christophe Gaffory (born 10 May 1988 in Bastia) is a French professional footballer who plays as a striker for FC Balagne.

International career
Gaffory represented Corsica in a game against Congo.

Career statistics
Scores and results list Corsica's goal tally first, score column indicates score after each Gaffory goal.

References

External links
 

1988 births
Living people
Footballers from Corsica
French footballers
Association football forwards
Corsica international footballers
SC Bastia players
Vannes OC players
Stade Bordelais (football) players
FC Bastia-Borgo players
Ligue 2 players
Championnat National players
Championnat National 2 players
Championnat National 3 players